Scheggino is a comune (municipality) in the Province of Perugia in the Italian region Umbria, located about 60 km southeast of Perugia. As of January 2020, it had a population of 464 and an area of 35.2 km².

Scheggino borders the following municipalities: Ferentillo, Monteleone di Spoleto, Sant'Anatolia di Narco, Spoleto.

Physical geography
The small village of Scheggino is located in the heart of the Valnerina, in the south-eastern part of Umbria. The territory is entirely mountainous and is crossed by the river Nera.

From the sloping castle set at the top of a rock, Scheggino develops downstream to the village that runs alongside the river, merging into a single complex. The area is at high seismic risk as indicated in the P.C.M. n. 3274 of 20/03/2003 and in the Delibera Giunta Regionale of 18 September 2012 n. 1111, which places Scheggino together with the neighbouring municipalities in zone 1, the most dangerous and with high seismic intensity.

History
A town of medieval origin with remains of walls and a semi-destroyed donjon from the same period, it was built in the 12th century by the Duchy of Spoleto as a defensive outpost and for this reason was attacked and sacked several times. The 16th century was characterised by a series of struggles between the aristocratic families of the Orsini, supporters of the Guelph Spoleto, and the Colonna, allies of the 23 Ghibelline castle-communes of the Spoleto district. In 1522 Scheggino was besieged by the neighbouring castles, led by Picozzo Brancaleoni and Petrone da Vallo, who took advantage of the absence of the men occupied in the fields to conquer the village, but did not succeed in their undertaking as they were repelled by the women and young people who rushed to defend their homes.

Main Sights
The Church of San Nicola dates back to medieval times and was extensively renovated in the first half of the 16th century. The building contains frescoes inspired by the forms of Giovanni Di Pietro. As a tribute to Spoleto, the Coronation of the Virgin was painted in the apse just like in the Cathedral of Spoleto. Also of interest is the church of Santa Felicita (12th century), which retains its original appearance with the exception of the façade, which was modified in the 17th century.

Demographic evolution

Traditions and folklore
On the night between the ninth and tenth of December, the Festa della Venuta is celebrated by lighting large bonfires.

On 23 July there is the Festa delle Donne ("Women's Festival") with a re-enactment of the historical episode of 1522 that saw the women of Scheggino as protagonists in the defence of the castle from the invasion by the castles of Valnerina, who were against the alliance between the village and the Duchy of Spoleto.

On Epiphany Day, the Canto della Pasquarella is celebrated in which young people go around the village collecting gifts which are then consumed in the evening at a communal dinner.

Infrastructure and transport

Railways
From 1926 to 1968 Scheggino (together with the municipality of Sant'Anatolia di Narco) was served (through the homonymous station) by the Spoleto-Norcia railway, a narrow-gauge line connecting Spoleto with Norcia, which remained in operation from 1 November 1926 to 31 July 1968, when it was abolished. The traces of the railway are almost all preserved, and the trackbed has been converted into a cycle path.

References

Cities and towns in Umbria